Pelentong River ( or ) is a river in Negeri Sembilan, Malaysia.

See also
 List of rivers of Malaysia

References

Rivers of Negeri Sembilan
Rivers of Malaysia